Jean-Benoît Bost (born 27 July 1961, in Neuilly-sur-Seine) is a French mathematician.

Early life and education
In 1977, Bost graduated from the Lycée Louis-le-Grand and finished first in the Concours général, the national competition for the places at the elite schools. Bost studied from 1979 to 1983 (qualifying in 1981 for the agrégation des mathématiques) at the École Normale Supérieure (ENS), where he was from 1984 to 1988 agrégé-préparateur (teacher) and worked under the direction of Alain Connes.

Career
From 1988, Bost was chargé de recherches and from 1993 directeur de recherches at CNRS. From 1993 to 2006, he was maître de conferences at the École polytechnique. He has been a professor at l'Université Paris-Saclay (Paris XI) in Orsay since 1998.

Research
Bost deals with noncommutative geometry (partly in collaboration with Alain Connes) with applications to quantum field theory, algebraic geometry, and arithmetic geometry. The eponymous Bost conjecture is a variant of the Baum–Connes conjecture.

Awards and honors
In 1990, he received the Prix Peccot-Vimont of the Collège de France. In 2002, he received the Prix Élie Cartan of the Académie des sciences. In 1986 he was an invited speaker at the International Congress on Mathematical Physics in Marseille. In 2006, he was an invited speaker with talk Evaluation maps, slopes, and algebraicity criteria at the International Congress of Mathematicians in Madrid.

From 2005 to 2015, Bost was a senior member of the Institut Universitaire de France. He was elected in 2012 a Fellow of the American Mathematical Society and in 2016 a member of Academia Europaea.

See also
Arakelov theory
Bost–Connes system

Selected publications
 As editor with François Loeser and Michel Raynaud:  Courbes semi-stables et groupe fondamental en géométrie algébrique  (Luminy, December 1998), Birkhäuser 2000
  Introduction to compact Riemann Surfaces, Jacobean and Abelian Varieties.  In: Michel Waldschmidt, Claude Itzykson, Jean-Marc Luck, Pierre Moussa (eds.):  Number Theory and Physics.  Les Houches 1989, Springer 1992

References

External links
 CV
 

20th-century French mathematicians
21st-century French mathematicians
École Normale Supérieure alumni
Academic staff of Paris-Saclay University
Members of Academia Europaea
Fellows of the American Mathematical Society
People from Neuilly-sur-Seine
1961 births
Living people